Karmazin may refer to :

People
John Karmazin, Sr. (23 May 1884–May 1977) was an American engine component inventor and business founder.
Mel Karmazin (born August 24, 1943)[1] is an American executive. 
Roman Karmazin (born January 2, 1973 in Kuznetsk) is the former IBF Light Middleweight champion of the world.
Viliam Karmažin (1922-2018), Slovak composer and conductor

Enterprises
The Karmazin Products Corporation was founded in Wyandotte, Michigan during 1946 by John Karmazin, Sr.

Other use
Karmazin (grape), another name for the red wine grape Blaufrankisch